The 2013–14 McNeese State Cowgirls basketball team represented McNeese State University during the 2013–14 NCAA Division I women's basketball season. The Cowgirls were led by seventh year head coach Brooks Donald-Williams, played their home games at Burton Coliseum, with three home games at Sudduth Coliseum. They are members of the Southland Conference.  At the conclusion of the 2014 Southland Conference women's basketball tournament the Cowgirls received an invitation to compete in the 2014 Women's Basketball Invitational tournament.

Roster

Schedule
Source

|-
!colspan=9| Regular Season

|-
!colspan=9| 2014 Southland Conference women's basketball tournament

|-
!colspan=9| 2014 Women's Basketball Invitational

See also
2013–14 McNeese State Cowboys basketball team

References

McNeese Cowgirls basketball seasons
McNeese State
McNeese State
McNeese State